Kari-Pekka Enqvist (born February 16, 1954 in Lahti, Finland) is a professor of cosmology in the Department of Physical Sciences at the University of Helsinki. Enqvist was awarded his PhD in theoretical physics in 1983.

Enqvist is the chairman of the scientific advisory board of Skepsis ry (a Finnish sceptics' society) and has written many books that popularize physics.

In 1997 Enqvist was granted the Magnus Ehrnrooth Foundation Physics Award for his efforts in particle physics and cosmology.

In 1999, he was awarded the Tieto-Finlandia award, Finland's most significant award for non-fiction, for his book Olemisen porteilla ("At the gates of being").

Enqvist retired from the University of Helsinki in 2019.

References

External links 
 Kari Enqvist's homepage

20th-century Finnish physicists
Finnish science writers
Particle physicists
Finnish skeptics
Finnish atheists
Academic staff of the University of Helsinki
People from Lahti
1954 births
Living people
Tieto-Finlandia Award winners
Cosmologists
21st-century Finnish physicists